The Indianapolis Enforcers were a professional indoor football team based in Indianapolis, Indiana. The team was a member of the Continental Indoor Football League. The Enforcers joined the CIFL in 2011 as an expansion team. The Enforcers were the second indoor football team to be based in Indianapolis, the first being the Indiana Firebirds of the Arena Football League from 2001 to 2004. The founder and owner of the Enforcers was K.C. Carter. The Enforcers played their home games at The SportZone in Indianapolis after playing the 2011 season as a travel team.

In 2018, the team was relaunched as a member of the regional Midwest Professional Indoor Football (MPIF), a developmental indoor league. In 2019, the MPIF and the American Arena League (AAL) agreed to an affiliation and some MPIF teams moved up to the AAL Midwest Division. The first teams in the division were the Enforcers, West Michigan Ironmen, and Chicago Aztecs.

Franchise history

2011–2012

The Enforcers came into existence when Carter, the owner of the Mid-States Football League's Indianapolis Stampede, put together an expansion franchise to compete in the CIFL. Having been involved with football as a player, owner, head coach, or league commissioner for over 35 years, Carter wanted to take on the challenge of the indoor football game. He put his team together in just 32 days, acquiring players with the understanding that there would be no pay that year. He did not want to be a team that promised the world and delivered nothing. This team was assembled by invitation only. He found his talent in his semi-pro team, The Stampede, and Team USA. He also recruited a few players from Central State University and from the defunct Fort Wayne FireHawks.

Because they joined the CIFL so late, they had no lease to play games in a home arena. This caused the Enforcers to play on the road in 2011, with the hopes of finding a permanent home in 2012. Carter had aspirations that Conseco Field House or the Pepsi Coliseum would be the home for the Enforcers in 2012. On February 26, 2011, the Enforcers lost their first game by a score of 69–12 to the Port Huron Predators. On March 19, 2011, the Enforcers gave up a Cincinnati Commandos record eight touchdown passes to Tyler Sheehan. On April 2, 2011, the Enforcers again became a part of CIFL history, as they gave up a record eight rushing touchdowns in a single game in a 78–0 defeat by the Marion Blue Racers. The Enforcers lone victory in its expansion season was a 2-0 forfeit win over the Predators as they failed to finish the season. They finished the season 1-9 and 6th overall.

For the 2012 season, the Enforcers began playing their home games at the SportZone in Indianapolis. The team removed defensive coordinator Tiny Lee and replaced him with Brian Hendricks, who would also serve as the wide receivers coach. The team also announced the signing of CIFL veteran quarterback Ron Ricciardi to help lead the offense. Ricciardi brought instant stability to the offense, throwing five touchdowns in his first game coming off the bench. Those five touchdowns were more than any Enforcers quarterback had thrown all season in 2011. On March 31, 2012, the Enforcers hosted their first ever home game, and defeated the Chicago Vipers 40-34 for their first ever franchise victory in a played game. After defeating Chicago, Ricciardi sustained a season-ending injury. The Enforcers struggled to score the rest of the season, and did not win another game. They finished with a 1–9 record, which placed the team in 5th place out of six teams.

2018–2021
In 2018, Carter relaunched the Enforcers as members of the regional developmental Midwest Professional Indoor Football (MPIF). Following the season, the MPIF was merged into the American Arena League (AAL) as its Midwest Division, with the Enforcers and 2018 MPIF champions West Michigan Ironmen joining the AAL for 2019. The Enforcers played their home games in Off The Wall Sports, an indoor soccer complex in nearby Carmel, Indiana. By the end of the season, the Enforcers and Ironmen were the only remaining Midwest Division teams still in the AAL, thereby qualifying for the playoffs and losing to the Ironmen 71–0.

For the 2020 season, the team announced it would be moving home games to the Indiana Farmers Coliseum in Indianapolis. However, the season was cancelled before it could begin due to the onset of the COVID-19 pandemic closing arenas. The team planned to return to the Coliseum for the 2021 season, but with the ongoing effects of the pandemic, moved back to Off The Wall Sports. On January 12, 2022, the team announced that it had ceased operations permanently.

Logos and uniforms 
The team's logo was introduced in January 2011 when the team announced that they would be start playing that year. Their logo featured a bulldog in a police uniform, with a patch symbolizing the rank of a sergeant, holding a football in a single arm above a line reading "Enforcers" with "Indianapolis" below that on a ribbon. The team's primary uniform colors were royal blue and white. The Enforcers' helmet was white with a bulldog holding a football on both ends with a single arm. The team wore blue pants and white jerseys for the entire 2011 season. For the 2012 season, the team introduced white pants with a blue stripe on the sides, as well as a blue home jersey.

Players and personnel

Final CIFL roster

Awards and honors
The following is a list of all Indianapolis Enforcers players who were named to the CIFL Player of the Week on either offense, defense, or special teams.

Coaches

Season-by-season results

See also

 The Forum at Fishers

References

External links
Official website
MPIF Enforcers website
CIFL Indianapolis Enforcers official website
2011 schedule

 
American football teams in Indiana
Former Continental Indoor Football League teams
American football teams established in 2010
2010 establishments in Indiana